Aigars Nerips (born 7 September 1967) is a professional Latvian basketball coach currently signed with Latvian club TTT Riga. He is also head coach of Latvia women's national basketball team.

References 

1967 births
Living people
Latvian basketball coaches
Soviet basketball coaches
People from Salacgrīva Municipality